The Guy-Greenbrier earthquake swarm occurred in central Arkansas beginning in August 2010. The epicenters of earthquakes in the swarm showed a linear distribution, with a clear overall shift in activity towards the southwest with time, and the largest event in the swarm was the 2011 Arkansas earthquake, at 4.7 on the moment magnitude scale.

Cause
It has been suggested that the swarm was triggered by drilling activities associated with the exploration and production of shale gas in the Fayetteville Shale in northern Arkansas.

See also
List of earthquakes in 2010
List of earthquakes in 2011
List of earthquakes in the United States
Enola earthquake swarm
Oklahoma earthquake swarms (2009–present)

References

Earthquake swarms
Earthquakes in Arkansas
2010 earthquakes
2011 earthquakes